McDade is an unincorporated community in Montgomery County, Alabama, United States. The community was settled in the 1810s and named for a prominent local family. Revolutionary War veteran James McDade is buried in the McDade  family cemetery (Manning Springs)

References

Unincorporated communities in Montgomery County, Alabama
Unincorporated communities in Alabama